Mind Games is a 1989 American thriller film directed by Bob Yari and written by Kenneth Dorward. The film stars Maxwell Caulfield, Edward Albert, Shawn Weatherly and Matt Norero. The film was released on March 3, 1989, by Metro-Goldwyn-Mayer.

Plot
Rita and Dana Lund's marriage is in a crisis, Rita's frustrated from being just a housewife. To save their marriage, they set out for a camping trip through California with their son. At a camping site they meet the hitch-hiker Eric, who befriends their son. Against Rita's will, Dana takes him with them, not knowing that he's a brutal psychopath who'll force their son to participate in his nightly trips of vandalism.

Cast 
Maxwell Caulfield as Eric Garrison
Edward Albert as Dana Lund
Shawn Weatherly as Rita Lund
Matt Norero as Kevin Lund

References

External links 
 

1989 films
American thriller films
1989 thriller films
Metro-Goldwyn-Mayer films
1980s English-language films
1980s American films